Elections to the Swiss Federal Council were held on 10 December 2003 to elect all seven of Switzerland's Federal Council. The 246 members of the United Federal Assembly elect the seven members individually by an absolute majority of votes, with the members serving for four years, beginning on 1 January 2004, or until resigning.

Six of the seven incumbents were running for re-election. Five were re-elected, but Ruth Metzler lost in her re-election bid: the first time an incumbent Federal Councillor had failed to be re-elected since 1872. In her place was elected Christoph Blocher of the Swiss People's Party (SVP). This modified the magic formula, by which the four largest parties have shared power on the Federal Council by a set formula since 1959; Metzler's Christian Democratic People's Party (CVP) was reduced from two seats to one, and Blocher's SVP increased from one to two.

Results

Seat held by Moritz Leuenberger

Seat held by Pascal Couchepin

Seat held by Ruth Metzler

Seat held by Joseph Deiss

Seat held by Samuel Schmid

Seat held by Micheline Calmy-Rey

Vacant seat

Footnotes

External links
  Federal Assembly webpage on 2003 Federal Council election

Federal Council
2003